Mader's Cove  is a community in the Canadian province of Nova Scotia, located in the Lunenburg Municipal District in Lunenburg County . The current area is mostly along the Mader's Cove Road along the waters of Mahone Bay and includes Westhaver Beach. It is bounded on the west by the old railway, now part of the Bay to Bay Trail, that runs along the old number 3 Highway.
 
Original founders of the cove were of German/Swiss descent. On A.F. Church's 1883 map of the area surnames in the area included Mader, Strum, Smeltzer, Deal, Westhaver, Eisenhauer, Crooks, Roast, Ernst, Hyson, Loy, Zwicker, Wynook, Slaunwhite, Hebb, Ham, and Pickels.

References
Cove on Destination Nova Scotia

Communities in Lunenburg County, Nova Scotia
General Service Areas in Nova Scotia